A S.W.A.T. Healin' Ritual, is the debut album by Witchdoctor which was released on April 21, 1998. A Music Video (co-directed by Stephanie Black & Malik Sayeed) was made for the song "Holiday".

Track listing

Personnel
Witchdoctor, Dre, Big Boi; Cee-Lo, Mook B., Cool Breeze, Big Rube, Joi, Whilde Peach, Daddy Q, Big Gipp, T-Mo, Phoenix, Khujo (vocals); Kevin Sipp (spoken word); ROB (various instruments); Martin Terry (acoustic guitar, guitar); Shawn Grove (acoustic guitar); Reggie Harris, Tomi Martin, David Whilde, Donnie Mathis, Junior Kinsey (guitar); Felix Ferrer, Kerren Berrz (violin); Larry Flannagan (viola); Spencer Brewer (cello); Chanz (keyboards, organ, Rhodes, Moog bass, background vocals); Euneika Rogers (commentary); Preston Crump (bass); David Sheats (drum & keyboard programming); Black Market Entertainment, Organized Noize Productions (drum programming); Espraronza, Lil Wil, Mark Starks, Collier Starks, Debra Killings, Wallstreet, Daddy Q.

Producers include: Organized Noize Productions, ROB, Emperor Searcy, Mr.DJ, Witchdoctor.

References

1998 albums
Witchdoctor (rapper) albums